Rice burner is a pejorative term originally applied to Japanese motorcycles and which later expanded to include Japanese cars or any East Asian-made vehicles. Variations include rice rocket, referring most often to Japanese superbikes, rice machine, rice grinder or simply ricer.

Riced out is an adjective denigrating a badly customized sports compact car, "usually with oversized or ill-matched exterior appointments". Rice boy is a US derogatory term for the driver or builder of an import-car hot rod. The terms may disparage cars or car enthusiasts as imposters or wanna-bes, using cheap modifications to imitate the appearance of high performance.

The term is often defined as offensive or racist stereotyping. In some cases, users of the term assert that it is not offensive or racist, or else treat the term as a humorous, mild insult rather than a racial slur.

Early usage 1917 to 1930s
Examples of "rice burner" used literally, meaning one who burns rice or rice fields, as in stubble burning, date to 1917. In 1935 it appeared in a US newspaper caption in with a racial connotation, disparaging East Asian people.

Korean War early 1950s
Canadian troops in the Korean War initially referred to the Korean labor and support unit providing their food, water, ammunition and other supplies as "G Company" which was short for the racist slur gook. They quickly became known instead as "rice burners," due to the Canadians' admiration for their Korean support unit's demonstrated strength and  stamina in carrying  loads over rough terrain, sometimes in snow and ice. While dehumanizing the Koreans as machines that ran on rice was a form of contempt, it was condescendingly approved by the men serving at the time as an improvement over the word it replaced. Comparably, Alaskan slang for a sled dog is "fish burner," as in a beast of burden that runs on fish.

UK 1960s
"Rice-burner" appeared in the British motorcycling magazine The Motor Cycle in 1966 as a generally disparaging term for Japanese motorcycles.

US 1970s
By the 1970s, rice burner was a US English slang term for the Vietnamese people during and after the Vietnam War. It was used in the US by "Detroit loyalists" to disparage more economical Japanese competitors of the US car industry during the 1970s energy crisis. It continued to appear in US publications through the 2002 to as a put-down for Japanese and other Asian cars.

UK 1980s
"The Rice Burner" was a turbocharged Kawasaki Z1000-engined drag-bike, built and raced by North Coventry Kawasaki, a retail motorcycle business in Coventry, England, specializing in turbocharged conversion kits for street and competition machines procured from Jack O'Malley, of Orient Express, New York.

Poser stereotype
T-Mobile's 2005 "Poser Mobile" parody advertisements created a stereotypical caricature "rice burner" or "boy racer" car as perceived by critics of the import scene, along with such cars' ethnically stereotypical Asian and Latino drivers, whose appearance and behavior is comically aspirational and "phony", contrasted with African-Americans and whites whose clothing, speech, and cars are racially-coded as more "authentic". The video, online and point-of-purchase display ad campaign, created by the Publicis agency's Seattle office, was about the "Poser Mobile Posse", including "Big Spenda Lopez", "The Fee Jones", "25 cent Chang" who are weak imitations of both real hip hop performers and a "real" mobile phone provider.

See also
Ah Beng (Singapore/Malaysia)
Antonym: sleeper
Boy racer (UK term)
Car tuning
Hoon
Import scene
Street racing

Notes

References

External links

 

Automotive terminology
DIY culture
Metaphors referring to food and drink
Modified vehicles
Pejorative terms related to technology